Tomomi Nakao (中尾 巴美 Nakao Tomomi, born 27 November 1981) is a former Japanese volleyball player who played for Ageo Medics.

Profiles
She played as the captain of Ageo Medics.

Clubs
NobeokaGakuen High School → Daiichi YoujiKyouiku College → Ageo Medics (2002–2009)

National team
 2008 - 1st AVC Women's Cup

References

External links
JVA Biography
Ageo Medics Officialwebsite

1981 births
Living people
Japanese women's volleyball players
Ageo Medics players